Mothers against decapentaplegic homolog 2 also known as SMAD family member 2 or SMAD2 is a protein that in humans is encoded by the SMAD2 gene. MAD homolog 2 belongs to the SMAD, a family of proteins similar to the gene products of the Drosophila gene 'mothers against decapentaplegic' (Mad) and the C. elegans gene Sma. SMAD proteins are signal transducers and transcriptional modulators that mediate multiple signaling pathways.

Function 

SMAD2 mediates the signal of the transforming growth factor (TGF)-beta, and thus regulates multiple cellular processes, such as cell proliferation, apoptosis, and differentiation. This protein is recruited to the TGF-beta receptors through its interaction with the SMAD anchor for receptor activation (SARA) protein. In response to TGF-beta signal, this protein is phosphorylated by the TGF-beta receptors. The phosphorylation induces the dissociation of this protein with SARA and the association with the family member SMAD4. The association with SMAD4 is important for the translocation of this protein into the cell nucleus, where it binds to target promoters and forms a transcription repressor complex with other cofactors. This protein can also be phosphorylated by activin type 1 receptor kinase, and mediates the signal from the activin. Alternatively spliced transcript variants encoding the same protein have been observed.

Like other Smads, Smad2 plays a role in the transmission of extracellular signals from ligands of the Transforming Growth Factor beta (TGFβ) superfamily of growth factors into the cell nucleus. Binding of a subgroup of TGFβ superfamily ligands to extracellular receptors triggers phosphorylation of Smad2 at a Serine-Serine-Methionine-Serine (SSMS) motif at its extreme C-terminus. Phosphorylated Smad2 is then able to form a complex with Smad4. These complexes accumulate in the cell nucleus, where they are directly participating in the regulation of gene expression.

Nomenclature
The SMAD proteins are homologs of both the drosophila protein, mothers against decapentaplegic (MAD) and the C. elegans protein SMA. The name is a combination of the two. During Drosophila research, it was found that a mutation in the gene MAD in the mother repressed the gene decapentaplegic in the embryo. The phrase "Mothers against" was added, since mothers often form organizations opposing various issues, e.g., Mothers Against Drunk Driving, or (MADD).  The nomenclature for this protein is based on a tradition of such unusual naming within the gene research community.

Interactions 

Mothers against decapentaplegic homolog 2 has been shown to interact with:

 ANAPC10,
 DAB2,
 EP300,
 FOXH1,
 HDAC1,
 TGIF1,
 Insulin receptor,
 LEF1,
 Myc,
 MEF2A,
 PIAS3,
 PIN1,
 SKI protein,
 SKIL,
 SMAD3,
 SMURF2,
 SNW1,
 STRAP
 WWTR1

References

Further reading

Developmental genes and proteins
MH1 domain
MH2 domain
R-SMAD
Transcription factors
Human proteins